Sebastián Pérez Cardona (born 29 March 1993) is a Colombian professional footballer who plays as a midfielder for Portuguese Primeira Liga club Boavista.

He is known for his abilities to react quickly and his skills playing both in a defensive and an attacking role. He was referenced earlier in his career by media abroad his native Colombia as a highly rated top prospect in Colombia.

Club career

Atlético Nacional
On 4 March 2011, Pérez made his official debut for Nacional against Atlético Junior, replacing Macnelly Torres in the 86th minute. He would eventually win the 2011 Torneo Apertura with Los Verdolagas, making him the youngest player to win the honour at age 18. The following year, he was part of the Nacional squad that won both the Copa Colombia and the Superliga Colombiana, thus winning every top tier trophy in Colombia before the age of 20.

Following Colombia's exit from the 2013 FIFA U-20 World Cup, he was invited to Arsenal for a trial in August.  He came on as a sub in the 67th minute for Arsenal's friendly against Manchester City, wearing the number 32 jersey. Arsenal went on to win the game 3–1. Despite only playing for 26 minutes, Pérez was praised for his natural abilities despite being so young. Arsène Wenger stated that he was impressed with Pérez during the week trial and decided to add him in the game. Despite impressing both the London club and its fans, Pérez was unable to get a work-permit because 'he had yet to play at least 75% of Colombia's international matches'. Thus, he was sent back to Nacional. Despite this, Wenger claimed that he would continue monitoring Perez until an opportunity to sign him comes.

On 27 July 2016, Pérez and Atlético Nacional conquered the 2016 Copa Libertadores. This was his first major title. Before leaving Nacional, Pérez had converted himself into one of the most decorated players in Atlético Nacional's history, achieving ten titles with the club.

Boca Juniors
In 2016, Pérez signed with Argentinian club Boca Juniors. He could not play for the team from April 2017 to January 2018, due to an ACL injury.

Pachuca 
In September 2018 he was loaned out to Pachuca. He made his debut on 26 September in a 3-0 victory against Cafetaleros de Chiapas as part of the Copa MX. However, that ended up being his first and only game for the club and he only made one other substitute appearance.

Barcelona S.C. 
On 3 January 2019, Pérez transferred to Barcelona S.C. of Ecuador. He made his debut for the club on 6 February against Defensor Sporting in the 2019 Copa Libertadores. He later played 24 league games in the 2019 Ecuadorian Serie A without scoring any goals.

Boavista 
On 19 September 2020, his loan to Primeira Liga club Boavista was announced.

On 31 August 2021, Boavista exercised the option in the loan contract to purchase his rights permanently and signed a four-year contract with Pérez.

International career

Youth
Pérez first represented the U20 Colombia national team in 2011, where he took part in the 2011 FIFA U-20 World Cup that took place in his home land. He was then recalled for the 2013 South American Youth Championship, where Colombia eventually won the championship and qualified for the 2013 FIFA U-20 World Cup. There, Pérez would give impressive performances, attracting the likes of top European teams.

Senior
Pérez received his first call-up from the senior Colombia national team under the order of José Pékerman to face Bolivia and Ecuador for the 2018 World Cup qualifiers. He earned his first cap against Bolivia, being included in the starting 11 and playing 62 minutes before being replaced by Edwin Cardona. Colombia went on to win in La Paz 2–3. His first international goal came in the next qualifying game against Ecuador in Barranquilla on 29 March 2016. Assisted by Cardona, Pérez scored an acrobatic goal in the 3–1 victory.

In May 2018, he was named in Colombia's preliminary 35-man squad for the 2018 World Cup in Russia. However, he did not make the final cut.

International goals
As of match played on 20 June 2021. Scores and results list Colombia's goal tally first.

Style of play

Pérez was an amateur footballer, before joining Nacional in 2011, and yet was considered to be a 'pure natural talent' by the Colombian club. He is a well-known versatile player mostly because of his ability to use both feet accurately, as well as carrying 'panoramic vision' as shown through his accurate passing. Despite committing to a defensive midfielder most of the time, Pérez has shown that he is capable of shooting with precision from great distances. He is often regarded very high by many top teams such as Juventus and Paris Saint-Germain because of his potential, led to being almost being signed by each respective club at one point.

Pérez also spoke that committing to a defensive midfielder (as well as an overall midfielder in general) role throughout most of his games, was because of his admiration for Xavi, Xabi Alonso and Andrea Pirlo, that inspired him to make a difference in both defending and attacking. This is one of the reasons why he is often seen as a crucial player in counter-attacking.

Personal life
Pérez married Manuela Restrepo in 2015. In July 2016, the couple had their first child, a son. In 2017, Pérez became a vegan for ethical reasons.

Career statistics

Club

Notes

Honours

Club
Atlético Nacional
Categoría Primera A (5): 2011-I, 2013-I, 2013-II, 2014-I, 2015-II
Copa Colombia (2): 2012, 2013
Superliga Colombiana (2): 2012, 2016
Copa Libertadores (1): 2016

Boca Juniors
Primera División (1): 2016–17

International
Colombia
Copa América: Third place 2016
South American Youth Championship: 2013

References

External links

 

1993 births
Living people
People from Envigado
Colombian footballers
Colombia international footballers
Colombian expatriate footballers
Colombian expatriate sportspeople in Argentina
Colombian expatriate sportspeople in Mexico
Association football midfielders
Categoría Primera A players
Argentine Primera División players
Liga MX players
Ecuadorian Serie A players
Primeira Liga players
Atlético Nacional footballers
Boca Juniors footballers
C.F. Pachuca players
Barcelona S.C. footballers
Boavista F.C. players
Expatriate footballers in Argentina
Expatriate footballers in Mexico
Expatriate footballers in Portugal
Colombia under-20 international footballers
Copa América Centenario players
Footballers at the 2016 Summer Olympics
2021 Copa América players
Olympic footballers of Colombia
Sportspeople from Antioquia Department